Kings Meadows is a residential locality in the local government area (LGA) of Launceston in the Launceston LGA region of Tasmania. The 2016 census has a population of 3670 for the state suburb of Kings Meadows.
It is a suburb in the south of Launceston. Kings Meadows is located in the floor of a shallow valley, roughly 70m above sea level, which drains NE towards the small suburb of Punchbowl. Main access to the suburb from the CBD is from Hobart Road via the minor suburb of South Launceston. Kings Meadows High School is located in this suburb.

History 
Kings Meadows was gazetted as a locality in 1963.

Kings Meadows Post Office opened in 1915 and closed in 1926.

Geography
The Midland Highway (National Route 1) follows most of the western boundary, and Kings Meadows Link (Route C403) follows part of the southern boundary.

Road infrastructure
Route C403 (Kings Meadows Link) passes through the south-east portion of the locality from west to east.

References

Suburbs of Launceston, Tasmania
Localities of City of Launceston
Towns in Tasmania